The Peleng rat (Rattus pelurus) is a species of rodent in the family Muridae.
It is found only on Peleng Island off the southeastern coast of Sulawesi, Indonesia.

References

Rattus
Rodents of Sulawesi
Mammals described in 1941
Taxonomy articles created by Polbot